Jenő Ruffinyi (1 March 1846 in Dobsina, Hungary – 13 January 1924 in Dobšiná, Czechoslovakia) was a Hungarian mining engineer and amateur speleologist who, together with Gustav Lang und Andreas Méga, was the first to explore Dobšiná Ice Cave.

Background and education
The Ruffinyi family had moved to Dobsina (today Dobšiná, Slovakia) from Italy because Eugene's father accepted a position as a mining engineer in this city. The original name of his family was Ruffini. Jenő attended primary school in Dobsina, and high school in Késmárk (today Kežmarok, Slovakia). He then took up mining studies in Selmecbánya (today Banská Štiavnica, Slovakia), where he earned his degree in 1869. On his return to Dobsina, he became a mining overseer and metallurgical inspector.

Exploration of the Ice Cave
While touring Ducsa Hill near Dobsina with his friend, Lt. Gustav Lang, in 1869, Ruffinyi threw a stone into an opening in the rock that was known as Cold Hole in local lore. From the multiple and delayed echos, the men got the impression that a substantial cave must extend beyond the entrance and decided to return for an exploration. On June 15, 1870, Ruffinyi was the first to enter the cave, sliding down on a hemp rope.

Honors
The elementary school in Dobšiná, Jenő Ruffinyi Elementary School, is named after Ruffinyi.

References

Sources 
 Krenner J.S., Die Eishöhle von Dobschau. K. Ungar. Naturwissenschaftlichen Gesellschaft, 1874
 https://web.archive.org/web/20160307081514/http://www.macse.org/gravestones/byname.aspx?i=R&i2=Ru&l=Ruffinyi&pn=0&pg=0&id=2838

1846 births
1924 deaths
People from Rožňava District
19th-century Hungarian people
20th-century Hungarian people
Speleologists
Mining engineers
Hungarian people of Italian descent